Lake Panasoffkee is a census-designated place (CDP) in Sumter County, Florida, United States. The population was 3,551 at the 2010 census.

History

Early inhabitants
Boggy Island was an autonomous black Seminole village that was settled by Central African slaves from Kongo.  Black Seminoles settled near the Boggy Island area of Lake Panasoffkee around 1813 and named it Sitarkey's Village after Sitarkey, an Alachua Seminole who had settled in the area.  Nearby laid the areas of Gum Slough and Indian Mound Springs. The Seminoles used the Lake Panasoffkee area to hold councils and Green Corn Dances.

The black Seminoles raised corn, rice, and sugar cane which Dexter gave them in 1822.  In addition, residents in Sitarkey's Village raised livestock, including cattle, horses, and hogs.  They also possibly planted one of the oldest orange groves in Florida.

Second Seminole War
Generally, the Sitakey's Village area was untouched during the Second Seminole War, allowing black Seminole families to use the area as a refuge from the war.  The United States Army, however, did search the village twice.  Looking for Seminole warriors, the Second and Eighth Infantry divisions, led by Colonel Bennet Riley and Colonel W. J. Worth, traveled from Fort McClure to the Lake Panasoffkee area on June 10, 1840. On the morning of June 11, the troops found an empty village.
After the battle of Wahoo Swamp, Osceola, possibly suffering from the effects of malaria that he contracted during the Seminole occupation of Fort Drane  moved to the Panasoffkee Swamp to live with the black Seminoles who regarded him with devotion.  On January 10, 1837, General Thomas Sidney Jesup, looking for Osceola, raided the village.  Osceola and three warriors fled.  Jesup captured 16 black Seminoles while the rest of the village escaped.  In all, Osceola, 50 warriors, and their families left for the headwaters of the Ocklawaha River.  Twelve days later, Jesup led his troops from Fort Armstrong to the Ocklawaha River.

Modern town
According to Broward Mill, the past president of the Sumter County Historical Society, Lake Panasoffkee from the time that Sumter County was settled by whites until damaging freezes which wiped out the area's citrus industry in the 1880s and 1890s.

Charles G. King, a Cleveland entrepreneur, bought 2,500 acres (square kilometers) in Lake Panasoffkee and developed 737 acres (square kilometers) into Monarch Grove in 1908.  An oak hammock on the property was left undisturbed.  King and his employees used the sour oranges planted by the Seminoles for orange stock.  In 1926, the grove produced about 40,000 boxes of oranges.

Among the evidence was a group of house foundations and chimneys located in places where there were no known white settlers.  County officials later believed that the cemetery was a family cemetery as the newer marked graves listed the names of the few people known to be buried there.

Lake Panasoffkee dredging
According to Florida Fish and Wildlife Conservation commissioners Bob Wattendorf and Marty Hale, Lake Panasoffkee had 15 fish camps and was considered to be one of the state's best places to fish.

In 1981, water levels in Lake Panasoffkee dropped to levels that had not been seen since 1962, the year the Wysong Dam was built.  Southwest Florida Water Management District officials discussed the construction of a temporary dam to elevate water levels.  Lake Panasoffkee residents believed that the Wysong Dam contributed to the destruction of the Withlacoochee River.

Geography

Demographics

As of the census of 2000, there were 3,413 people, 1,644 households, and 1,045 families residing in the CDP. The racial makeup of the CDP was 97.01% White, 0.64% African American, 0.73% Native American, 0.47% Asian, 0.15% from other races, and 1.00% from two or more races. Hispanic or Latino of any race were 0.91% of the population.

There were 1,644 households, out of which 16.8% had children under the age of 18 living with them, 52.7% were married couples living together, 7.6% had a female householder with no husband present, and 36.4% were non-families. 30.8% of all households were made up of individuals, and 18.7% had someone living alone who was 65 years of age or older.  The average household size was 2.08 and the average family size was 2.52.

In the CDP, the population was spread out, with 15.4% under the age of 18, 5.6% from 18 to 24, 20.1% from 25 to 44, 25.5% from 45 to 64, and 33.5% who were 65 years of age or older.  The median age was 53 years. For every 100 females, there were 94.1 males.  For every 100 females age 18 and over, there were 92.0 males.

The median income for a household in the CDP was $25,930, and the median income for a family was $31,897. Males had a median income of $26,483 versus $17,985 for females. The per capita income for the CDP was $18,149.  About 8.1% of families and 12.0% of the population were below the poverty line, including 17.6% of those under age 18 and 8.8% of those age 65 or over.

Famous events

Little Miss Lake Panasoffkee case

Two hitchhikers from Illinois discovered the partially decomposed body of an unidentified woman between the ages of 17 and 24 years old under the northbound lane of Lake Panasoffkee's Interstate 75 overpass on February 19, 1971. She was found with a man's belt around her neck.

The sheriff's department made several attempts to identify the woman.   In 1986, the Sumter County Sheriff's Department, under the leadership of Sheriff Jamie Adams and lead investigating officer William O. Farmer, exhumed her body.  A forensic anthropologist rendered composite sketches of the woman both at the time of her death and as a child, and the investigator also determined the woman's weight and height. In the early 1990s, the American television series Unsolved Mysteries featured the case in an episode. Each attempt to identify the woman was unsuccessful.

In 2012, the Sumter County Sheriff's Department asked the University of South Florida's Tampa Bay Cold Case Project to reexamine the remains of "Little Miss Lake Panasoffkee". An isotope analysis performed by the project indicated she could have been an immigrant from Greece, possibly hailing from the town of Lavrion (located 60 miles (96 kilometers) southeast of Athens). The victim is believed to have moved to the United States between one and three months prior to her murder.  The new information contradicted the Sumter County Sheriff's Department's initial assumption that the Jane Doe was either white or Native American; they had created composite sketches reflecting those ethnicities. Sumter County authorities determined, based on the time of her death, that she was visiting the Tarpon Springs area for the celebration of Epiphany on January 6, 1971. Based on the information from the forensic analysis, the Sumter County Sheriff's Department contacted the Tarpon Springs Police Department and the Greek Orthodox Church about the case and mailed 6,000 flyers to Tarpon Springs businesses and residents.  As of 2016, the case is still unsolved.

Long nose gar
On April 14, 1985, Evan Merritt caught a 41-pound long nose gar in Lake Panasoffkee. This is the largest long nose gar caught in the state of Florida.

Preserves
The Lake Panasoffkee park and preserve protects  and offers birdwatching, biking, camping, horseback riding, fishing, hiking and hunting. It is accessed from the south side of State Route 44 two miles (3 km) west of Interstate 75. Similar recreational opportunities (except no biking) are also offered at the  Panasoffkee Outlet park and preserve. Both areas are protected by the Southwest Florida Water Management District.

References

External links

 Lake Panasoffkee Community Portal
 Lake Panasoffkee History (Sumter Today)

Census-designated places in Sumter County, Florida
Census-designated places in Florida
Angolan-American history
Congolese-American history